The Harrison House is historic slave plantation home property in Franklin, Tennessee that was listed on the United States National Register of Historic Places (NRHP) in 1975.  It was built perhaps in 1810 and was extended and remodelled in 1848 by William Harrison.  The remodelling added a "two-story entrance portico and second-story gallery porch typical of many antebellum homes."

Confederate Brig. Gen. John H. Kelly died and was buried here, after a smaller, earlier battle.

After the Battle of Franklin, Confederate Brig. Gen. John C. Carter was brought here and died on Dec. 10, 1864.

References

Houses in Franklin, Tennessee
Houses on the National Register of Historic Places in Tennessee
Houses completed in 1810
National Register of Historic Places in Williamson County, Tennessee